Gwalia in Liverpool, England is a Grade II listed building. It was built between 1851 and 1854 and was formerly known as Sandfield Tower.

History
The building was built for Joseph Edwards, a merchant who traded with South America, from 1857. Over the years, the building changed hands several times until it was bought by the Church of Christ, Scientists of the Fourth. The building has been disused since the 1980s.

The building is in a bad state of repair and Liverpool City Council has been in discussions with its owners since 2004 to take action on its state, threatening them with a compulsory purchase order. The owners, Quirefast, claimed in 2016 that they were speaking with potential buyers who were interested in converting the buildings to apartments. As of late 2022, the building remains in a poor state.

Gallery

References

Grade II listed buildings in Liverpool
Unused buildings in Liverpool
1857 establishments in England